For Lists of rulers of India, see:

List of Indian monarchs (c. 3000 BCE – 1956 CE)
List of presidents of India  (1950–present)
List of prime ministers of India (1947–present)

India history-related lists
Lists of political office-holders in India